Masucci is a surname. Notable people with the surname include:

Agostino Masucci (c. 1691–1758), Italian painter
Alexander "Alex" Masucci (born 1949), American music executive, producer, songwriter and promoter
Gaetano Masucci (born 1984), Italian football player
Giulia Masucci Fava (1858–?), Italian painter
Jerry Masucci (1934–1997), American businessman
Matias Masucci, Italian-born American actor and film director
Oliver Masucci (born 1968), German actor

See also 
Masuccio